Coquitlam is the fifth most populous city in Metro Vancouver and the sixth most populous city in British Columbia. The city is home to 9 buildings over 100 m (328 ft) tall, including those currently under construction or proposed.

Coquitlam Town Centre, the central residential and commercial district of Coquitlam, has become home to numerous high-rise buildings since the mid-2000s. Much of the recent development has been spurred by the Evergreen Extension, part of the Millenium Line of the Skytrain system. The district contains the highest concentration of high-rise condominiums in the Tri-Cities.

Tallest buildings
This list ranks buildings in Coquitlam that stand at least 60 metres (197 ft) tall, based on CTBUH height measurement standards. This includes spires and architectural details but does not include antenna masts.

Tallest buildings under construction
This includes spires and architectural details but does not include antenna masts.

Proposed

See also 
List of tallest buildings in British Columbia
List of tallest buildings in Burnaby
List of tallest buildings in Surrey

References 

Coquitlam
Tallest
Tallest buildings in Coquitlam